People awarded the honorary citizenship of the city of Valletta, Malta are:

Honorary citizens of Valletta
Listed by date of award:

References

Honorary citizens of Valletta
Valletta
Malta-related lists